Tim Cahill (born 1944 in Nashville, Tennessee) is a travel writer who lives in Livingston, Montana, United States.  He is a founding editor of Outside magazine and currently serves as an editor at large for the magazine.

Biography
Cahill spent his childhood primarily in Waukesha, Wisconsin. He attended the University of Wisconsin–Madison on a swimming scholarship. Along with professional long-distance driver Garry Sowerby, Cahill set a world record for speed in driving the entire length of the American continents, from Ushuaia in Tierra del Fuego in southern Argentina up along the Pan-American Highway to Prudhoe Bay, Alaska in twenty-three days, twenty-two hours, and forty-three minutes. This trip was the source material for his 1991 book Road Fever. He has written several books recounting his adventure travel experiences and blends his own brand of humor into his stories.  He is a frequent contributor to National Geographic Adventure magazine.

Cahill lost his wife, Linnea Larson, to a traffic accident in April 2008.

Bibliography
Buried Dreams : Inside the Mind of a Serial Killer, Bantam Books: 1986. 
Jaguars Ripped My Flesh: Adventure is a Risky Business, Bantam Books: 1987. 
A Wolverine Is Eating My Leg, Vintage Books: 1989. 
Road Fever: A High-Speed Travelogue, Random House: 1991. 
Pecked To Death By Ducks, Random House: 1993. 
Pass The Butterworms: Remote Journeys Oddly Rendered, Villard: 1997. 
Dolphins (book), National Geographic: 2000. 
Hold The Enlightenment, Villard: 2002. 
Lost in my own Backyard : a Walk in Yellowstone National Park, Crown Journeys: 2004. 
Not So Funny When It Happened : the Best of Travel Humor and Misadventure (editor), Travelers' Tales: 2000.

References

External links
 
 
 Tim Cahill, Mishap Maestro, Outside Bozeman, March 2000 (accessed online 2009-04-02)
 A Google Map of Cahill's transcontinental drive in "Road Fever"
 Tim Cahill on the birth of Outside

1944 births
Living people
Writers from Nashville, Tennessee
People from Waukesha, Wisconsin
Writers from Tennessee
Writers from Wisconsin
American travel writers
American male non-fiction writers
University of Wisconsin–Madison alumni
San Francisco State University alumni
American magazine editors
American magazine writers
American magazine journalists